Saira Shekeb Sadat is the first female Wuluswal (English: sub-governor) of Afghanistan. She was appointed as the governor of the provincial district of Aqcha of Jowzjan Province.

References

Governors of Jowzjan Province